Evalea eclecta is a species of sea snail, a marine gastropod mollusk in the family Pyramidellidae, the pyrams and their allies.

Description
The white shell is slender and has a conical shape. Its length measures 4.6 mm. Its surface is covered with minute spiral striae. The auricular aperture is small. The columella has a fold.

Distribution
This species is widely distributed in the Indo-Pacific. It is also found off the Hawaiian islands Maui, Oahu and Kauai

References

External links
 To World Register of Marine Species

Pyramidellidae
Gastropods described in 1918